Tutelina Mill, also known as Clarke's Mill, is a Grade II listed tower mill at Great Welnetham, Suffolk, England which has been conserved.

History

Tutelina Mill was built in 1865. A steam mill was erected nearby. The windmill worked by wind until 1910. The sails were removed in 1916, and the mill was worked by a Crossley engine until the mid-1960s.

Description

Tutelina Mill is a small four storey tower mill. It had a domed cap, winded by a fantail. The four Patent sails drove two pairs of millstones. The wallower is cast iron with wooden teeth, carried on a cast iron upright shaft. The great spur wheel is also cast iron with wooden teeth.

==References==

External links
Windmill World webpage on Tutelina Mill.
2007 photo of the mill.

Windmills in Suffolk
Tower mills in the United Kingdom
Windmills completed in 1865
Grinding mills in the United Kingdom
Grade II listed buildings in Suffolk
Grade II listed windmills
Borough of St Edmundsbury